This is a list of equipment of the Chilean Marine Corps (CIM) currently in use. It includes small arms, artillery, military vehicles, watercraft and UAVs.

Equipment

Handguns

Battle / assault rifles

Sniper rifles

Submachine guns

Machine guns

Grenade launchers

Anti-armor weapons

Mortars

Howitzers

Anti-ship weapons

Armoured vehicles

Utility vehicles

Shelter vehicles

Support trucks

Watercraft

UAVs

See also
 List of current equipment of the Chilean Air Force
 List of current equipment of the Chilean Army
 List of active ships of the Chilean Navy
 List of active Chile military aircraft

References

Chilean Navy
List
Current equipment